Lieutenant General Ranjit Singh Dyal, PVSM, MVC (15 November 1928 – 29 January 2012) was an Indian Army general and an administrator. As a soldier, Ranjit Singh led the capture of the Haji Pir pass by the Indian army during the 1965 war with Pakistan. He also drew up the plans for Operation Blue Star, and served as the General-Officer-Commanding-in-Chief of the Southern Command. Later, he served as Lieutenant Governor of Puducherry and the Andaman and Nicobar Islands.

Early life 

Ranjit Singh Dyal was born in a Sikh family of the Teokar (also spelled Tuker) village in Punjab, British India (in the present-day Kurukshetra district of Haryana). His father was Sardar Bahadur Risaldar Ram Singh Dyal. His brother Rattan Singh Dyal was also in the army, and was awarded the Indian Distinguished Service Medal. He attended the Rashtriya Military School, Chail.

Military career 

Dyal completed his schooling from Rashtriya Military School Chail and then graduation in 1942, and was admitted to the Indian Military Academy, Dehradun in 1946. He was later commissioned in the Punjab Regiment (Para) of the Indian Army, and was assigned to the 1st Battalion, which participated in the first Indo-Pak War during 1948 as a part of the 50 Independent Parachute Brigade. Between 1959 and 1962, he was deployed in the North-East Frontier Agency (NEFA) sector. After further education from the Defence Services Staff College, he was posted as a brigade major to the 50 Independent Para Brigade. Subsequently, he became second-in-command of the 1st Para (Special Forces) battalion in the Uri sector. He later commanded this battalion during 1965-1968 in Jammu & Kashmir, and also as part of the 50 Independent Para Brigade at Agra.

Indo-Pakistani War of 1965

During the Indo-Pakistani War of 1965, Ranjit Singh (then a Major) led the 1st Para team to capture the strategic Haji Pir pass (which was later handed over to Pakistan after the Tashkent Agreement). According to the original plan prepared by Lieutenant General Harbaksh Singh, the then General-Officer-Commanding-in-Chief (GOC-in-C) of the Western Command, the Army was to capture Rustan and Badori (or Bedori) on the way to the Haji Pir pass. Ranjit Singh's unit was tasked with capturing Sank, Sar and Ledwali Gali to stop the enemy infiltration. However, the attack on Sank on the night of 25/26 August was unsuccessful, resulting in 18 casualties. Ranjit Singh's paratroopers captured Sank on the night of 26/27 August, and Point 1033 the next day. Meanwhile, four attacks on Rustan and Badori by other battalions had proved unsuccessful. Ranjit Singh then volunteered to capture the Haji Pir pass, and his battalion took over the operation on 27 August. The unit moved along the Hyderabad nullah with only damp shakarparas and biscuits as field ration. Ranjit Singh's paratroopers were fired upon by the Pakistani Army, but were saved by an unexpected shower. They subsequently captured some Pakistani soldiers from a house during the trek, took over their weapons and used them as  load carriers for rest of the journey to the pass. The unit launched the final assault on the pass on 28 August, walking up 4,000 feet on foot. The attack was successful, as the Pakistan troops retreated from the pass. Ranjit Singh Dyal was awarded the Maha Vir Chakra for this operation.

Maha Vir Chakra Citation
The citation for the Maha Vir Chakra reads as follows

In 1984, Ranjit Singh Dyal was appointed the security adviser to the Governor of Punjab for the Operation Blue Star, and effectively had the overall charge of leading the assault. At that time, he was chief of staff of the Western Army Command. Along with Kuldip Singh Brar and Krishnaswamy Sundarji, he drew up the plans to evict the Khalistani militants from the Golden Temple in Amritsar. In 2005, the Chandigarh police arrested two Babbar Khalsa militants recruited by Jagtar Singh Hawara to kill Ranjit Singh in retaliation for the Operation Blue Star.

Ranjit Singh later became the General-Officer-Commanding-in-Chief (GOC-in-C) of the Southern Command. He also served as the first head of the Chandigarh regional chapter of the Punjab Regiment Officers Association (PROA) in 2008.

Gubernatorial career 

Ranjit Singh Dyal served as the 10th Lieutenant Governor of Puducherry. He served from June 1988 to February 1990. After this stint, Dyal took over as the Lieutenant Governor of Andaman and Nicobar Islands.

Last days 

In his last years, General Singh was diagnosed with prostate cancer. He died on 29 January 2012 in the Command Hospital at Panchkula, where he had been admitted for terminal care.

References 

|-

Indian generals
Lieutenant governors of the Andaman and Nicobar Islands
Lieutenant Governors of Puducherry
Recipients of the Maha Vir Chakra
Military personnel of the Indo-Pakistani War of 1965
People from Kurukshetra district
Para Commandos
2012 deaths
1928 births
Recipients of the Param Vishisht Seva Medal